Sorhagenia is a genus of moths in the family Cosmopterigidae. The name honours Ludwig Friedrich Sorhagen.

Species
Sorhagenia baucidis Hodges, 1969
Sorhagenia cracens Hodges, 1978 
Sorhagenia daedala Hodges, 1964 
Sorhagenia dahurica Sinev, 1986 
Sorhagenia fibigeri Koster & Sinev, 2003
Sorhagenia griseella Sinev, 1993
Sorhagenia janiszewskae Riedl, 1962 
Sorhagenia lophyrella Douglas, 1846 
Sorhagenia maurella Sinev 
Sorhagenia nimbosus (Braun, 1915) (syn: Sorhagenia nimbosa)
Sorhagenia pexa Hodges, 1969
Sorhagenia reconditella Riedl, 1983
Sorhagenia rhamniella (Zeller, 1839)
Sorhagenia riedli Sinev, 1986
Sorhagenia taurensis Koster & Sinev, 2003 
Sorhagenia vicariella Sinev, 1993

References
Natural History Museum Lepidoptera genus database

Chrysopeleiinae